Frankie & Alice is a 2010 Canadian drama film directed by Geoffrey Sax, starring Halle Berry. Filming began in Vancouver, British Columbia, in November 2008, and ended in January 2009. To qualify for awards season, the film opened in a limited release on December 10, 2010. It is based on a true story about a popular go-go dancer/stripper in the 1970s who has dissociative identity disorder.

While the film received mixed reviews from critics, Berry's performance was widely praised and she received several accolades, including a nomination for the Golden Globe Award for Best Actress in a Motion Picture – Drama.

Plot
Frankie is performing at a Los Angeles club in 1973. She is one of the best strippers at the club, and often attracts the attention of wealthy businessmen. One night, the club's female employees go out for a "Girls Night". As the girls observe all the men at the bar, Frankie gets the attention of a well-known bartender. She agrees to go to his home forl sex. Before the two can engage in any sexual activity, Frankie switches to an alter ego, and cracks the man's head open with a picture frame. Word of Frankie's violent activity spreads to the strip club quickly, and Frankie is fired from the needed job. Similar episodes occur while Frankie is at the laundromat and at a wedding.

Frankie starts psychotherapy with Doctor Oz. During a session, Frankie learns that she has two alters: Genius, a seven-year-old child; and Alice, a Southern white racist, whom Frankie struggles to overcome. Through regular sessions with Dr. Oz, Frankie begins to recall the traumatic events that led to the dissociative splits in her personality. She realizes that when she was a teenager she was in love with a white man who died in a car accident while they were on the road. In the same session, she also connects with the memory of the birth of her child. Moments after the birth, Frankie's mother realizes that the child is half-white and kills it, thus triggering Frankie's personality to split.

After she watches the taped sessions, and puts everything together, Frankie begins the healing process, taking control of her life and semi-integrating the personalities that Dr. Oz assures her will always be present.

Cast

Production
The film spent a decade in development, with Berry involved in the project since the mid-1990s. Filming took place in 2008.

Release
Frankie & Alice had its world premiere in May 2010 at the Cannes Film Festival. It went on to screen at the AFI Film Festival that November, and was given a limited release in the United States on December 10, 2010, to qualify for awards. The film's producers, Access Motion Pictures, had planned for a wider release the following February, but these plans did not materialize even as Berry was nominated for a Golden Globe Award and won an NAACP Image Award for her performance.

In September 2013, Codeblack Films acquired distribution rights to the film. The film was given a wider re-release on April 4, 2014.

Reception

Critical response 
On Rotten Tomatoes, the film has an approval rating of 21% based on reviews from 33 critics. The website's critics consensus states: "Halle Berry gives it her all (and then some), but Frankie & Alice is ultimately too narratively strained and clumsily assembled to do her performance justice." On Metacritic it has a score of 47% based on reviews from 14 critics, indicating "mixed or average reviews".

Writing of the Cannes Film Festival screening, The Hollywood Reporter described the film as "a well-wrought psychological drama that delves into the dark side of one woman's psyche". The review also said Halle Berry was "spellbinding" as Frankie, with "rock-solid" supporting performances.

Accolades 
 African-American Film Critics Association
 Nominee, Best Picture
 Winner, Best Actress: Halle Berry
 Golden Globes
 Nominee, Best Actress in a Motion Picture Drama: Halle Berry
 NAACP Image Awards
 Winner, Outstanding Actress in a Motion Picture: Halle Berry
 Winner, Outstanding Independent Motion Picture
 Prism Award
 Winner, Performance in a Feature Film: Halle Berry

References

External links
 
 
 
 

2010 films
2010 independent films
Films about dissociative identity disorder
English-language Canadian films
Fictional couples
Films shot in Vancouver
Films set in Vancouver
Canadian drama films
Canadian independent films
Films about psychiatry
Films directed by Geoffrey Sax
Films scored by Andrew Lockington
Films set in 1973
Lionsgate films
Films about striptease
2010s English-language films
2010s Canadian films